Saltasaurini is a tribe of titanosaur sauropods known from the Late Cretaceous of Patagonia, Argentina. The clade was named in 2007 by Leonardo Salgado and José Bonaparte for the "least inclusive clade comprising Neuquensaurus and Saltasaurus", being equivalent to the use of Saltasaurinae in Salgado et al. (1997). Found only in the Campanian to Maastrichtian sediments of the Neuquén Basin, Salgado & Bonaparte (2007) decided a more restrictive clade was needed because of the expansion of Saltasaurinae as defined to include far more taxa than it originally encompassed. Saltasaurini includes the original core of Saltasaurinae: Neuquensaurus, Saltasaurus, Rocasaurus and Bonatitan, although some studies exclude Bonatitan from the clade.

Below is a cladogram by Villa et al. (2022), from the description of the new European saltasaurine Abditosaurus, collapsed to show the internal relationships of Saltasaurinae.

References

Cretaceous dinosaurs
Saltasaurids